The M1 in, Queensland, Australia, is a major urban road corridor. It connects the Sunshine Coast hinterland to Tugun, near the New South Wales and Queensland border, via the following corridors:
 Bruce Highway between Kybong and Bald Hills
 Gateway Motorway between Bald Hills and Eight Mile Plains
 Pacific Motorway between Eight Mile Plains and Tugun

The Pacific Motorway continues on south from the M1 into New South Wales, while the Bruce Highway continues further north from the M1 up the Queensland coast. Both of these roads and the M1 itself are part of the line of route of National Highway 1, although M1 signage is used for that part of the corridor.

Development
The Bruce Highway from Kybong to Gympie remains signed as A1. Section D of the project (Woondum to Curra, including a bypass of Gympie) will, when completed, become the next stage of the M1.

Note: While the references use Woondum as a designator for sections of the project the new intersection that marks the end of the M1 is wholly within the locality of Kybong, although bordered on two sides by Woondum.

Travel Centres
A number of travel/service centres exist on the M1. These include:

Bruce Highway
 Caboolture (Both Directions)
 Glasshouse Mountains (Both Directions)
 Traveston (Northbound, Accessible for Southbound Traffic)
Gateway Motorway
 Nudgee (Northbound)
Pacific Motorway
 Stapylton (Southbound)
 Coomera (Northbound)

Major interchanges
 

Bruce Highway
 Bruce Highway (A1) – continues north to Cairns
 Myall Street (State Route 6)
 Eumundi–Noosa Road (State Route 12 east)
 Yandina–Coolum Road (State Route 11)
 Nambour–Bli Bli Road (State Route 10 east / Tourist Drive 23 west), Sunshine Coast Airport
 Maroochydore Road (State Route 8) east / Nambour Connection Road west, Big Pineapple
 Sunshine Motorway (State Route 70)
 Steve Irwin Way (State Route 6 / Tourist Drive 24) west / Caloundra Road (State Route 6) east
 D'Aguilar Highway (State Route 85)
 Uhlmann Road (State Route 60 west)
 Deception Bay Road (State Route 26 east)
 Anzac Avenue (State Route 71)
 Gateway Motorway (M1) east / Gympie Arterial Road (M3) south, Brisbane, Brisbane Airport
Gateway Motorway
 Bruce Highway (M1)
 Deagon Deviation (State Route 26)
 Depot Road (State Route 27)
 Sandgate Road (State Route 26) – no exit
 Southern Cross Way – to M7, Eagle Farm
 Moreton Drive – Brisbane Airport
 Kingsford Smith Drive
 Southern Cross Way – to  M7, Eagle Farm
Route becomes  for Sir Leo Hielscher Bridges
 Lytton Road (State Route 24)
 Port of Brisbane Motorway (M4) – Port of Brisbane, 
 Wynnum Road (State Route 23)
 Old Cleveland Road (State Route 22), Sleeman Sports Complex
 Mount Gravatt–Capalaba Road (Metroad 2 west / State Route 21 east)
 Miles Platting Road (State Route 56), Eight Mile Plains busway station, Sunnybank
 Pacific Motorway (M1 south-east / M3 north-west)
Pacific Motorway
 Gateway Motorway (M1) 
 Rochedale Road (State Route 30)
 Logan Road (State Route 30)
 Paradise Road (State Route 50)
 Chatswood Road (State Route 50)
 Bryants Road (State Route 47)
 Beenleigh — Redland Bay Road (State Route 47)
 Logan Motorway (M6)
 City Road  (State Route 92)
 Main Street (State Route 94)
 Hope Island Road (State Route 4) / Tamborine — Oxenford Road (State Route 95)
 Gold Coast Highway (State Route 2)
 Smith Street Motorway (State Route 10)
 Southport–Nerang Road (State Route 20)
 Nerang–Broadbeach Road (State Route 90)
 Nielsons Road (State Route 40)
 Gold Coast–Springbrook Road (Gooding Drive, State Route 50)
 Robina Parkway (State Route 42)
 The Link Way (State Route 99)
  Somerset Drive / Robina Parkway (State Route 7)
 Reedy Creek Road (State Route 80)
 Bermuda Street (State Route 3)
 Stewart Road (State Route 98) – to Gold Coast Highway (State Route 2)
 Pacific Motorway (M1) – continues south into New South Wales

Metroad 1
 
Metroad 1 in Brisbane, Queensland, Australia, is the former designation of the M1 road corridor in Brisbane. It connected Bald Hills to the southern suburb of Beenleigh via Gateway Motorway, between Bald Hills and Eight Mile Plains, and Pacific Motorway, between Eight Mile Plains and Beenleigh.

Incidents
On August 4, 2017 a tanker carrying hydrochloric acid caught fire and exploded on the M1 near Loganholme, resulting in a 1km exclusion perimeter. There were no injuries.

See also
 Metroad

References

Transport in Brisbane
Transport on the Gold Coast, Queensland
Highways in Queensland